Jakob Rosenhain (Jacob, Jacques) (2 December 1813 – 21 March 1894) was a German Jewish pianist and composer.

Rosenhain was born in Mannheim made his debut at the age of 11. During their 1837 season, he was a soloist with the London Philharmonic Orchestra (on 17 April), which in 1854 (also in April) programmed one of his symphonies.

He was a friend of Felix Mendelssohn at least from 1839. He worked with Johann Baptist Cramer on a published school of piano-playing. From 1849 he made his home in Paris.

Rosenhain died in Baden-Baden.

Selected compositions
Four operas
 Der Besuch in Irrenhause (1834)
 Liswenna (1835)
 Le Démon de la Nuit (1851); Liswenna rewritten
 Volage et Jaloux (1863)
Orchestra
 Symphony No. 1 in G minor, Op. 42
 Symphony No. 2 in F minor, Op. 43 (performed, possibly premiered, 1846 by Mendelssohn in Leipzig)
 Symphony No. 3 "Im Frühling", Op. 61
Concertante
 Piano Concerto in D minor, Op. 73
Chamber works
 Piano Quartet in E, Op. 1
 Sonata in E for piano with violoncello or violin, Op. 38
 Piano Sonata in F minor, Op. 44?; à M. Fétis
 Sonate Symphonique in F minor (Piano Sonata No.2?), Op. 70 (pub. Breitkopf, 1887)
 Piano Sonata (No.3?) in D, Op. 74 (published by Breitkopf, 1886)
 3 String Quartets, Opp. 55, 57, 65 (pub. 1864)
 Sonata in D minor for cello (or violin, or viola) and piano, Op. 98. (manuscript for viola, noted in RISM and dates from 1893)
 Four Piano Trios
Songs
 at least two dozen

References

Bibliography
 
 Brown, James Duff (1886). . A. Gardner. page 522.
 Hubbard, W. L. (William Lines) (1910/2005 reprint) . Kessinger Publishing. .
 May, Florence (1905). . E. Arnold. Pages 28–9.
 Pratt, Waldo Selden; Mendel, Arthur (1907). . G. Schirmer. Page 538.

External links

1813 births
1894 deaths
19th-century classical composers
19th-century classical pianists
19th-century German composers
19th-century German Jews
19th-century German male musicians
19th-century German pianists
German classical pianists
German male classical composers
German male pianists
German opera composers
German Romantic composers
Jewish classical composers
Male classical pianists
Male opera composers
Musicians from Mannheim